Azari or the Ancient Language of Azerbaijan is a treatise written by the Iranian scholar Ahmad Kasravi in 1925, about the history of the Azeri language. This book has been approved by orientalists. In this book, Kasravi, using numerous documents and manuscripts, argues that the Old Azeri language (also known as "Azeri" or "Azari") should not be categorized as a member of the  Turkic languages, but as an Iranian language, a descendant of the Median language.

This treatise, which was Kasravi's first serious work, was very influential worldwide and led to a new theory in Iran about the existence of Iranian roots in the Azeri language.

In the words of the Encyclopædia Iranica:

Concept 
Kasravi's motivation for writing the work was political. He published the work in a period of raging controversy between papers based in Iran, Istanbul (i.e. Turkey) and Baku (i.e. Azerbaijan SSR) on the Origin of the Azerbaijanis. Kasravi, after studying both arguments, concluded that the claims of the Turkish journalists were unfounded and non-academic, and the replies of the Iranian journalists were not "founded in a knowledge of history".

In this book, Kasravi first proposed the theory that the language of the region of Azerbaijan in northwestern Iran was a language of the Iranian language family until a few centuries before the Turkic domination in this region. According to historical evidence, he named this language Azeri. This book made Kasravi famous in Iranian studies circles and he became a member of scientific circles abroad. The first edition of the book, and consequently the processing of theory, was based only on historical contexts. Later, Kasravi studied linguistics and in later editions of the book, he also dealt with this theory according to its linguistic foundations.

Kasravi's research motivated researchers to search for the remains of that historical language in different parts of Azerbaijan and find other examples of this language. Iranica adds:

Kasravi's historical monuments have been recognized by other scholars. Vladimir Minorsky says about Kasravi: "Kasravi has the spirit of an honest historian. He is meticulous in detail and in presentation"

Legacy 
The treatise Azari or the Ancient Language of Azerbaijan started a new wave in historiography and linguistics in Iran. Since the publication of this treatise, various researches based on this book have been done for the etymology of Azeri language. Later, foreign and Iranian professors, linguists, and orientalists wrote articles in support of the Azeri treatise.

References 

Books by Ahmad Kasravi
Persian-language books
Treatises
Historical linguistics books
Academic works about linguistics
1925 non-fiction books
Azerbaijan (Iran)
Historiography of Iran